The Men's Hammer throw event at the 2011 World Championships in Athletics was held at the Daegu Stadium on August 27 & 29.

Koji Murofushi took the lead with his first throw, improving on each of his first three throws to 81.24.   Primož Kozmus moved into second place with a second round 79.39 while Krisztián Pars made a minor improvement with every throw (except his failed fifth attempt), passing Kozmus on his fourth throw.  Pars last throw was his best, but 81.18 was not quite enough to catch Murofushi.

Medalists

Records

Qualification standards

Schedule

Results

Qualification
Qualification: Qualifying Performance 77.00 (Q) or at least 12 best performers (q) advance to the final.

Final

External links
Hammer throw results at IAAF website

Hammer throw
Hammer throw at the World Athletics Championships